Browning is an unincorporated community located in Leflore County, Mississippi.

It is part of the Greenwood, Mississippi micropolitan area.

History
Browning is located on the Columbus and Greenville Railway and was once known as Adlena. A post office operated under the name Adlena from 1898 to 1903 and under the name Browning from 1903 to 1912.

Browning was once home to a vocational school.

Gallery

References

Unincorporated communities in Leflore County, Mississippi
Unincorporated communities in Mississippi
Greenwood, Mississippi micropolitan area